Port Crescent State Park is a public recreation area on Lake Huron  southwest of Port Austin in Huron County at the tip of The Thumb of Michigan. The state park covers  along state route M-25 in Hume Township. The park occupies the site of Port Crescent, a ghost town which once stood at the mouth of the Pinnebog River. The park was designated a Michigan "dark sky preserve" in 2012.

History
The park's first 124 acres were purchased by the state in 1956. One of the last visible remnants of the vanished town of Port Crescent, the 120-foot-tall Pack & Woods Sawmill chimney, was razed in 1961, despite the objections of residents who felt the loss of the local landmark. The park was expanded with the purchase of an additional 455 acres in 1977.

Activities and amenities
The state park offers swimming, picnicking, canoeing, fishing,  of hiking trails, cross-country skiing, and a 142-site campground and cabin.

References

External links
Port Crescent State Park Michigan Department of Natural Resources
Port Crescent State Park Map Michigan Department of Natural Resources

State parks of Michigan
Lake Huron
Protected areas of Huron County, Michigan
Protected areas established in 1955
1955 establishments in Michigan
IUCN Category III